Meriç Bridge,  Yeni Köprü, meaning New Bridge or Mecidiye Bridge, after Sultan Abdülmecid I, is a historic Ottoman bridge in Edirne (formerly Adrianople), Turkey. It crosses the Meriç river,  carrying the state road .

Construction of the bridge began under the Ottoman sultan Mahmud II (r. 1808–1839), and was completed in 1843 by his successor Abdülmecid I (r. 1839–1861). The  and  bridge has twelve arches.

References

External links

 https://www.academia.edu/23674853/Edirne_Taş_Köprüleri_Edirne_Stone_Bridges

Ottoman bridges in Turkey
Arch bridges in Turkey
Bridges in Edirne
Bridges completed in 1843
Road bridges in Turkey
Bridges over the Meriç
Tourist attractions in Edirne
1843 establishments in the Ottoman Empire
19th-century architecture in Turkey